This is a list of Sheriffs and High Sheriffs of Gloucestershire, who should not be confused with the Sheriffs of the City of Gloucester.
 
The High Sheriff is the oldest secular office under the Crown (in England and Wales the office previously known as sheriff was retitled High Sheriff on 1 April 1974). Formerly the Sheriff was the principal law enforcement officer in the county but over the centuries most of the responsibilities associated with the post have been transferred elsewhere or are now defunct, so that the High Sheriff's functions are now largely ceremonial.  The High Sheriff changes every March.

As of 2006, the Sheriff's territory or bailiwick is covered by the administrative areas of Gloucestershire County Council and of South Gloucestershire District Council. Sir Robert Atkyns, the historian of Gloucester, writing in 1712 stated that no family had produced more Sheriffs of this county than Denys.

Sheriffs

12th and 13th century
1071–c. 1082: Roger de Pitres (Roger of Gloucester) 
c. 1082–1096 Durand of Gloucester (brother of Roger, died 1096) 
1097–1121 Walter de Gloucester (nephew of Durand, son of Roger, retired bef. 1129 to become monk) 
1121–c. 1129: Miles FitzWalter de Gloucester (son of Walter, died 1143)
?–1155: Roger Fitzmiles, 2nd Earl of Hereford (son of Miles, died 1155)
1155–1157: Walter de Hereford (brother of Roger, died c.1159 on crusade)
1157–1163: William de Beauchamp
1164–1167: William Pypard
1168–1171: Gilbert Pypard
1171–1175: Ralph fitzStephen (Rad'us (Ralph) filius Stephen)
1175-1189: William fitzStephen (William filius Stephen)
1190–1195 William Marescallus (William Marshall)
1196–1199: Herbert son of Herbert
1199–1206: Willium Marescallus
1207–1208: Richard de Muegros
1209: Gérard d'Athée
1210–1215: Engelard de Cigogné
1216–1220: Ralph Musard
1220-1220: Sir Peter of Edgeworth
1220–1224: Ralph Musard 
1225–1230: William Putot
1230-1230: Sir Peter of Edgeworth
1230–1231: William Putot
1232–1234: Henry of Bath
1234–1236: William Talbot
1237–1238: Thurstan de Dispenser
1239–1245: John son of Geoffrey
1246–1250: Robert Walerand
1251–1252: John de Fleminge
1253–1256: Adam de Hittested
1257–1258: William de Lessberrow
1259: Robert de Maysy
1260–1262: John de Brun
1263–1265: Matheus Werill
1266–1269: Reginald de Acle
1269–1271: Pierre de Champvent
1271–1278: Ralph Musard
1280: Sir Richard de la Riviere 
1281–1284: Walter de Stuchesley
1285–1287: Roger de Lakington
1288–1289: Geoffrey de Mandiacre
1290–1292: Fulco de Locy
1293–1298: Fulco de Locy and Thomas de Gardinis
1299: John de Langley (1st term)

14th century

15th century

16th century

17th century

18th century

19th century

20th century

High Sheriffs

20th century

21st century

References
   The history of the worthies of England, Volume 1  By Thomas Fuller

External links
 Trans. Bristol & Gloucestershire Archaeological Society 128 (2010), 207–227 by CHRISTOPHER ELRINGTON List of Sheriffs of Gloucestershire

 
Gloucestershire
Local government in Gloucestershire
High Sheriff